The 2002 Bofrost Cup on Ice was the third event of six in the 2002–03 ISU Grand Prix of Figure Skating, a senior-level international invitational competition series. This was the final year of the event's inclusion in the Grand Prix series. It was held at the Sportparadies in Gelsenkirchen on November 8–10. Medals were awarded in the disciplines of men's singles, ladies' singles, pair skating, and ice dancing. Skaters earned points toward qualifying for the 2002–03 Grand Prix Final. The compulsory dance was the Tango Romantica.

Results

Men

Ladies

Pairs

Ice dancing

External links
 2002 Bofrost Cup on Ice

Bofrost Cup On Ice, 2002
Bofrost Cup on Ice